In the Fishtank is an ongoing project of Konkurrent, an independent music distributor in the Netherlands. In this project, Konkurrent invites one or two bands to record and gives them two days studio time. The first four albums were recorded by individual bands, but eight of the last ten releases were the result of two bands (three in one case) teaming up to record. The Ex is so far the only band to appear on more than one album in the series.

Album listing
In the Fishtank 1 – Nomeansno
In the Fishtank 2 – Guv'ner
In the Fishtank 3 – Tassilli Players
In the Fishtank 4 – Snuff
In the Fishtank 5 – Tortoise and The Ex
In the Fishtank 6 – June of 44
In the Fishtank 7 – Low and Dirty Three
In the Fishtank 8 – Willard Grant Conspiracy and Telefunk
In the Fishtank 9 – Sonic Youth, Instant Composers Pool, and The Ex 
In the Fishtank 10 – Motorpsycho and Jaga Jazzist Horns
In the Fishtank 11 – The Black Heart Procession and Solbakken
In the Fishtank 12 – Karate
In the Fishtank 13 – Solex and M.A.E.
In the Fishtank 14 – Isis and Aereogramme
In the Fishtank 15 – Sparklehorse and Fennesz

External links
In the Fishtank on Konkurrent web site

 
Dutch record producers